Kim Pearce (born 29 October 1985) is an English theatre director.

Education
Pearce attended Dame Alice Harpur School (now part of Bedford Girls' School). She went on to study at Warwick University then trained on the Theatre Directing MFA at Birkbeck College, University of London.

Work

Selected theatre productions
 Forgotten by Daniel York at the Arcola Theatre
 Love Steals Us From Loneliness at Camden People's Theatre and Chapter Arts Centre
 Unearthed on UK tour
 Solomon Child at the Manchester Royal Exchange Studio
 Cheaper Than Roses at Warwick Arts Centre Studio
 The Skriker at Warwick Arts Centre Studio

Other work
 The Curious Incident of the Dog in the Night-Time UK and Ireland Tour, Resident Director, 2014-15
 The Suicide at the National Theatre, Staff Director
 Moon Tiger at the Theatre Royal, Bath and UK tour, Assistant Director 
 Ghosts for ETT, Assistant Director
 Sweeney Todd at Chichester, Assistant Director
 The Way of the World at Chichester, Assistant Director
 A View from the Bridge at the Royal Exchange, Assistant Director
 Zack at the Royal Exchange, Assistant Director
 The Lady from the Sea at the Royal Exchange, Assistant Director
 Mogadishu'' at the Royal Exchange and Lyric Theatre (Hammersmith), Assistant Director

Pearce was also associate director of the pop-up Theatre On The Fly venue created with Assemble at Chichester Festival Theatre.

She is Associate Director for Papergang Theatre, and is working as a dramaturg for Yellow Earth Theatre and Gaggle Productions.

Awards
Pearce was recipient of a 2011/12 Regional Young Directors Scheme bursary and runner-up for the 2013 JMK Young Director award.

References

People educated at Dame Alice Harpur School
1985 births
Living people
Alumni of the University of Warwick
Alumni of Birkbeck, University of London
English theatre directors
Date of birth missing (living people)
Women theatre directors
Place of birth missing (living people)